Leo I (401 – 18 January 474), also known as "the Thracian", was Eastern Roman emperor from 457 to 474. He was a native of Dacia Aureliana near historic Thrace. He is sometimes surnamed with the epithet "the Great", probably to distinguish him from his young grandson and co-augustus Leo II.

Ruling the Eastern Empire for nearly 20 years, Leo proved to be a capable ruler. He oversaw many ambitious political and military plans, aimed mostly at aiding the faltering Western Roman Empire and recovering its former territories. He is notable for being the first Eastern Emperor to legislate in Koine Greek rather than Late Latin. He is commemorated as a saint in the Eastern Orthodox Church, with his feast day on 20 January.

Reign 

He was born in Thracia or in Dacia Aureliana province in the year 401 to a Thraco-Roman family. His Dacian origin is mentioned by Candidus Isaurus,  while John Malalas believes that he was of Bessian stock. He served in the Roman army, rising to the rank of comes rei militaris. Leo was the last of a series of emperors placed on the throne by Aspar, the Alan serving as commander-in-chief of the army, who thought Leo would be an easy puppet ruler. Instead, Leo became more and more independent from Aspar, causing tension that would culminate in Aspar's assassination.

Leo's coronation as emperor on 7 February 457, was the first to add a Christian element to the traditional Roman procedure,  having been performed by the Patriarch of Constantinople, a fact which symbolized the transformation of Roman imperial traditions into medieval and Christian ones. This Christian coronation ritual was later imitated by courts all over Europe.

Leo I made an alliance with the Isaurians and was thus able to eliminate Aspar. The price of the alliance was the marriage of Leo's daughter to Tarasicodissa, leader of the Isaurians, who, as Zeno, became emperor in 474. In 469, Aspar attempted to assassinate Zeno and very nearly succeeded. Finally, in 471, Aspar's son Ardabur was implicated in a plot against Leo but was killed by palace eunuchs acting on Leo's orders.

Leo sometimes overestimated his abilities and made mistakes that threatened the internal order of the Empire. The Balkans were ravaged by the Ostrogoths, after a disagreement between the Emperor and the young chief Theodoric the Great, who had been raised at Leo's court in Constantinople, where he was steeped in Roman government and military tactics. There were also some raids by the Huns. However, these attackers were unable to take Constantinople thanks to the walls, which had been rebuilt and reinforced in the reign of Theodosius II and against which they possessed no suitable siege engines.

Leo's reign was also noteworthy for his influence in the Western Roman Empire, marked by his appointment of Anthemius as Western Roman emperor in 467. He attempted to build on this political achievement with an expedition against the Vandals in 468, which was defeated due to the arrogance of Leo's brother-in-law Basiliscus. This disaster drained the Empire of men and money. Procopius estimated the costs of the expedition to be 130,000 pounds of gold; John the Lydian estimated the costs to be 65,000 pounds of gold and 750,000 pounds of silver. The expedition consisted of 1,113 ships carrying 100,000 men. The resulting battle heavely damaged the imperial treasury, partly of the treachery of Basiliscus, his wife's brother.

Leo died of dysentery at the age of 73 on 18 January 474.

Marriage and children 
Leo and Verina had three children. Their eldest daughter Ariadne was born prior to the death of Marcian (reigned 450 – 457). Ariadne had a younger sister, Leontia. Leontia was first betrothed to Patricius, a son of Aspar, but their engagement was probably annulled when Aspar and another of his sons, Ardabur, were assassinated in 471. Leontia then married Marcian, a son of Emperor Anthemius and Marcia Euphemia. The couple led a failed revolt against Zeno in 478–479. They were exiled to Isauria following their defeat.

An unknown son was born in 463. He died five months following his birth. The only sources about him are a horoscope by Rhetorius and a hagiography of Daniel the Stylite. The Georgian Chronicle, a 13th-century compilation drawing from earlier sources, reports a marriage of Vakhtang I of Iberia to Princess Helena of Byzantium, identifying her as a daughter of the predecessor of Zeno. This predecessor was probably Leo I, the tale attributing a third daughter to Leo. Cyril Toumanoff identified two children of this marriage: Mithridates of Iberia; and Leo of Iberia. This younger Leo was father of Guaram I of Iberia. The accuracy of the descent is unknown.

See also

 Church of St. Mary of the Spring (Istanbul)
 Life-giving Spring
 List of Byzantine emperors

Notes

References

Sources 
 
 
 
 
 
 Profile of Leo I in the Prosopography of the Later Roman Empire.
 Profile of Leo I in the Oxford Dictionary of Byzantium.
 Stephen Williams, Gerard Friell, The Rome that Did Not Fall The Survival of the East in the Fifth Century, Routledge Press, 1999,

External links 
 
 Leo I Timeline

400s births
474 deaths
5th-century Byzantine emperors
5th-century Christian saints
5th-century Roman consuls
Christian royal saints
Deaths from dysentery
House of Leo

Imperial Roman consuls
Roman-era Thracians

Year of birth uncertain
401 births